Aud Valborg Tønnessen (born 1 June 1964) is a Norwegian Lutheran theologian, church historian, professor of theology and the dean of the Faculty of Theology at the University of Oslo. She is an expert on Norwegian church history and Christian international humanitarian work. She was elected as a member of the Norwegian Academy of Science and Letters in 2016.

Selected works 
 Tønnessen, Aud Valborg: Kirkens Nødhjelp: Bistand, tro og politikk, Oslo: Gyldendal Norsk Forlag, 2007. 
 Jensen, Roger, Dag Thorkildsen og Aud Valborg Tønnessen (ed.): Kirke, protestantisme og samfunn: Festskrift til professor dr. Ingun Montgomery, Trondheim: Tapir Akademisk Forlag, 2006. 
 Tønnessen, Aud Valborg: "... et trygt og godt hjem for alle"? Kirkelederes kritikk av velferdsstaten etter 1945, Trondheim: Tapir Akademisk Forlag, 2000.

References 

1964 births
Living people
Norwegian theologians
Academic staff of the University of Oslo
Members of the Norwegian Academy of Science and Letters